Rory J Anders (born 10 December 1997) is an Irish cricketer. He made his Twenty20 cricket debut for Munster Reds in the 2017 Inter-Provincial Trophy on 26 May 2017. Prior to his Twenty20 debut, he was part of Ireland's squad for the 2016 Under-19 Cricket World Cup. He made his List A debut for Leinster Lightning in the 2020 Inter-Provincial Cup on 22 September 2020.

References

External links
 

1997 births
Living people
Irish cricketers
Leinster Lightning cricketers
Munster Reds cricketers
Cricketers from Dublin (city)